I Dream of Jeannie is an American fantasy sitcom television series, created by Sidney Sheldon that starred Barbara Eden as a sultry, 2,000-year-old genie and Larry Hagman, as an astronaut with whom she falls in love and eventually marries. Produced by Screen Gems, the show originally aired for 139 episodes over five seasons, from September 18, 1965, to May 26, 1970, on NBC.

Plot 

In the pilot episode, "The Lady in the Bottle", astronaut Captain Tony Nelson, United States Air Force, is on a space flight when his one-man capsule Stardust One comes down far from the planned recovery area, near a deserted island in the South Pacific. On the beach, Tony notices a strange bottle that rolls by itself. When he rubs it after removing the stopper, smoke starts shooting out and a Persian-speaking female genie materializes and kisses Tony on the lips, shocking him.

They cannot understand each other until Tony expresses his wish that Jeannie (a homophone of genie) could speak English, which she then does. Then, per his instructions, she "blinks" and causes a recovery helicopter to show up to rescue Tony, who is so grateful, he tells her she is free, but Jeannie, who has fallen in love with Tony at first sight after being trapped for 2,000 years, re-enters her bottle and rolls it into Tony's duffel bag so she can accompany him back home. One of the first things Jeannie does, in a subsequent episode, is break up Tony's engagement to his commanding general's daughter, Melissa, who, along with that particular general, is never seen or mentioned again. Producer Sidney Sheldon realized the romantic triangle between Jeannie, Tony, and Melissa would not pan out in the long run.

Tony at first keeps Jeannie in her bottle most of the time, but he finally relents and allows her to enjoy a life of her own. However, her life is devoted mostly to his, and most of their problems stem from her love for him and her often-misguided efforts to please him, even when he does not want her assistance. His efforts to cover up Jeannie's antics, because of his fear that he would be dismissed from the space program if her existence were known, brings him to the attention of NASA's resident psychiatrist, U.S. Air Force Colonel Dr. Alfred Bellows. In a running gag, Dr. Bellows tries over and over to prove to his superiors that Tony is either crazy or hiding something, but he is always foiled ("He's done it to me again!") and Tony's job remains secure. A frequently used plot device is that Jeannie loses her powers when she is confined in a closed space. She is unable to leave her bottle when it is corked, and under certain circumstances, the next person who removes the cork becomes her new master. A multiple-episode story arc involves Jeannie (in miniature) becoming trapped in a safe when it is accidentally locked.

Tony's best friend and fellow astronaut, United States Army Corps of Engineers Captain Roger Healey, does not know about Jeannie's magic for the first 16 episodes, although they meet in episode 12. When Roger finds out she is a genie, he steals her bottle, temporarily becoming her master. Roger is often shown as girl-crazy or scheming to make a quick buck. He occasionally has hopes of claiming Jeannie so he can use her to have a lavish lifestyle or gain beautiful girlfriends, but overall he is respectful that Tony is Jeannie's master. Both Tony and Roger are promoted to the rank of major late in the first season. In later seasons, Roger's role is retconned to portray him knowing about Jeannie from the beginning (i.e., to him having been with Tony on the space flight that touched down, and thus having seen Jeannie introduce herself to Tony).

Jeannie's evil fraternal twin sister, mentioned in a second-season episode (also named Jeannie – since, as Barbara Eden's character explains it, all female genies are named Jeannie — and also portrayed by Barbara Eden, in a brunette wig), proves to have a mean streak starting in the third season (as in her initial appearance in "Jeannie or the Tiger?"), repeatedly trying to steal Tony for herself, with her as the real "master". Her final attempt in the series comes shortly after Tony and Jeannie are married, with a ploy involving a man played by Barbara Eden's real-life husband at the time, Michael Ansara (in a kind of in-joke, while Jeannie's sister pretends to be attracted to him, she privately scoffs at him). The evil sister wears a green costume, with a skirt rather than pantaloons.

Early in the fifth season, Jeannie is called upon by her uncle Sully (Jackie Coogan) to become queen of their family's native country, Basenji. Tony inadvertently gives grave offense to Basenji national pride in their feud with neighboring Kasja. To regain favor, Tony is required by Sully to marry Jeannie and to avenge Basenji's honor by killing the ambassador from Kasja when he visits NASA. After Sully puts Tony through an ordeal of nearly killing the ambassador, Tony responds in a fit of anger that he is fed up with Sully and his cohorts and he would not marry Jeannie even if she were "the last genie on earth". Hearing this, Jeannie bitterly leaves Tony and returns to Basenji. With Jeannie gone, Tony realizes how deeply he loves her. He flies to Basenji to win Jeannie back. Upon their return, Tony introduces Jeannie as his fiancée. She dresses as a modern American woman in public. This changed the show's premise: hiding Jeannie's magical abilities rather than her existence. This, however, contradicts what is revealed in "The Birds and Bees Bit", in which it is claimed that upon marriage a genie loses all of her magical powers.

Cast and characters

Main 
 Barbara Eden as Jeannie
 Larry Hagman as Captain/Major Anthony "Tony" Nelson
 Bill Daily as Captain/Major Roger Healey
 Hayden Rorke as Colonel Alfred Bellows, MD

Recurring 
 Barton MacLane  as General Martin Peterson (seasons 1–4, 35 episodes)
 Emmaline Henry  as Amanda Bellows (seasons 2–5, 34 episodes)
 Vinton Hayworth as General Winfield Schaeffer (seasons 4-5, 20 episodes)
 Philip Ober     as Brigadier General Wingard Stone (season 1, episodes 1 and 4)
 Karen Sharpe    as Melissa Stone (season 1, episodes 1 and 4)
 Abraham Sofaer  as Haji, master of all the genies (seasons 2–3)
 Michael Ansara  as The Blue Djinn (season 2, episode 1), also as King Kamehameha (season 3, episode 19), last as Major Biff Jellico (season 5 episode 12) and directed "One Jeannie Beats Four of a Kind" (season 5 episode 25)
 Barbara Eden as Jeannie's evil fraternal twin sister, Jeannie II (seasons 3–5)

The role of Jeannie's mother was played by several actresses:
 Florence Sundstrom (season 1, episode 2)
 Lurene Tuttle (season 1, episode 14)
 Barbara Eden (season 4, episodes 2 and 18)

Production

Background 
The series was created and produced by Sidney Sheldon in response to the great success of rival network ABC's Bewitched series, which had debuted in 1964 as the second-most watched program in the United States. Sheldon, inspired by the 1964 film The Brass Bottle, conceived of the idea for a beautiful female genie. Both I Dream of Jeannie and Bewitched were Screen Gems productions.

When casting was opened for the role of Jeannie, producer Sidney Sheldon could not find an actress who could play the role the way that he had written it. He did have one specific rule: He did not want a blonde genie, because the similarity with the blonde witch on Bewitched would be too much. However, after many unsuccessful auditions, he called Barbara Eden's agent. Eden had coincidently co-starred in The Brass Bottle as mortal Sylvia Kenton.

The show debuted at 8 pm, Saturday, September 18, 1965, on NBC. When NBC began broadcasting most of its prime-time television line-up in color in the fall of 1965, Jeannie was one of two programs that remained in black and white, in its case because of the special photographic effects employed to achieve Jeannie's magic. By the second season, however, further work had been done on techniques to create the visual effects in color, which was necessary because by 1966 all prime-time series in the United States were being made in color.

Sheldon originally wanted to film season one in color, but NBC did not want to pay for the extra expenses, as the network (and Screen Gems) believed the series would not make it to a second season. Sheldon offered to pay the extra US$400 an episode needed for color filming at the beginning of the series, but Screen Gems executive Jerry Hyams advised him: "Sidney, don't throw your money away."

Opening sequence 
The first few episodes after the pilot (episodes two through eight) used a nonanimated, expository opening narrated by Paul Frees; the narration mentions that Nelson lived in "a mythical town" named Cocoa Beach in "a mythical state called Florida". The remaining episodes of that first season featured an animated sequence that was redone and expanded in season two, when the show switched from black and white to color. This new sequence, used in seasons 2–5, featured a retelling of the initial meeting in the pilot episode, with Captain Nelson's space capsule splashing down on the beach, and Jeannie dancing out of her bottle (modified to reflect its new decoration) and then kissing Nelson before the bottle sucks her back in at the end. Both original versions of the show's animated opening sequence were created by animator Friz Freleng.

Setting 
Although the series was set in and around Cape Kennedy, Florida, and Major Nelson lived at 1020 Palm Drive in nearby Cocoa Beach, locales in California were used in place of those in Florida. The exterior of the building where he and Major Healey had offices was actually the main building at the NASA Flight Research Center (renamed as the NASA Dryden Flight Research Center in March 1976 and as the Armstrong Flight Research Center in 2014) at Edwards Air Force Base, north of Los Angeles. "If you look at some of those old [episodes], it's supposed to be shot in Cocoa Beach, but in the background you have mountains — the Hollywood Hills," Bill Daily said. In actuality, the home of Major Nelson (also used as the Anderson house in Father Knows Best, and then the home of Mr. Wilson in Dennis the Menace) was filmed at the Warner Bros. Ranch, in Burbank (on Blondie Street). Many exteriors were filmed at this facility. Interior filming was done at the Sunset Gower Studios (the original Columbia Pictures studio lot) in Hollywood.

The cast and crew only made two visits to Florida's Space Coast, both in 1969. On June 27, a parade in Cocoa Beach escorted Eden and the rest of the cast to Cocoa Beach City Hall, where she was greeted by fans and city officials. They were then taken to LC-43 at Cape Canaveral where she pressed a button to launch a Loki-Dart weather rocket. They had dinner at Bernard's Surf, where Eden was given the state of Florida's Commodore Award for outstanding acting. Later, the entourage went to Lee Caron's Carnival Club, where Eden was showered with gifts and kissed astronaut Buzz Aldrin on the cheek, just two weeks before the Apollo 11 launch.

The cast and crew returned on November 25, 1969, for three days for a mock wedding of Eden and Hagman staged for television writers from around the nation (timed to the airing of the nuptials episode on December 2) at the Patrick Air Force Base Officers Club. Then-Florida Governor Claude R. Kirk, Jr., attended and cut the cake for the couple.

Eden returned 27 years later, in July 1996, as a featured speaker for Space Days at the Kennedy Space Center. Cocoa Beach Mayor Joe Morgan presented her an "I Dream of Jeannie Lane" street sign, later installed on a short street off Florida State Road A1A near Lori Wilson Park.

On September 15, 2005, the area held a "We Dream of Jeannie" festival, including a Jeannie lookalike contest. Plans for one in 2004 were interrupted by Hurricane Frances and Hurricane Jeanne. However, a Jeannie lookalike contest was held in 2004, with Bill Daily attending.

On August 24, 2012, Cocoa Beach City leaders honored the show with a roadside plaque outside Lori Wilson Park.

Jeannie's origin 

In the first season, Jeannie clearly was originally a human who was turned into a genie by (as later revealed [Season 1, Episode 2: "My Hero?"]) the Blue Djinn when she refused to marry him (the term "djinn" is synonymous with "genie"). Several members of Jeannie's family, including her parents, are rather eccentric, but none is a genie. Her mother describes the family as "just peasants from the old country" (Season 1, Episode 14, "What House Across the Street?"). The Blue Djinn was played by Barbara Eden's first husband, Michael Ansara. In later seasons, he also played King Kamehameha (Season 3, Episode 15 "The Battle of Waikiki"), and Biff Jellico (Season 5, Episode 12 "My Sister, the Homewrecker").

The topic of Jeannie's originally being human is restated in season two during the episode "How to be a Genie in 10 Easy Lessons". Jeannie mentions that she has a sister who is a genie, but the phrasing—"she was a genie when I left Baghdad"—does bring up the question of whether she, too, was born a genie. One minor subplot that lasted over multiple episodes was when Jeanie was born. In season 1, episode 5 ("G.I.Jeannie"), while applying for recruitment into the Air Force, Jeannie clearly states her birthday as July 1, 21 B.C. In Season 2, Episode 10 ("The Girl Who Never Had a Birthday"), Jeannie says she doesn't know her birth date, setting up the two-episode plot. It was revealed by a computation by a computer (ERIC) in part 1 that Jeannie was born in 64 BC, and in part two Roger reveals that her birthday is April 1.

In the third season, this continuity was changed retroactively and the dialog imply Jeannie had always been a genie. All her relatives are also depicted as genies, including, by the fourth season, her mother (also played by Barbara Eden beginning in Season 4, Episode 2 "Jeannie and the Wild Pipchicks"). Whatever the reason for the shift in the narrative concerning her origins, this new narrative was retained for the rest of the series.

The television film I Dream of Jeannie... Fifteen Years Later (1985) has Jeannie re-stating most of her first-season origin when she tells her son, Tony Jr., that she was trapped in her bottle by an evil djinn after she refused to marry him. (No specific statement is given about whether he turned her into a genie at that time or if she had been born one.)

In a 1966 paperback novel I Dream of Jeannie, by Al Hine, writing pseudonymously as "Dennis Brewster", published by Pocket Books, very loosely based on the series, Jeannie (in the book, her real name is revealed as "Fawzia") and her immediate family were established in the story as genies living in Tehran hundreds of years before Tony found her bottle on an island in the Persian Gulf (instead of the South Pacific, as depicted on TV).

Theme music 
The first-season theme music was an instrumental jazz waltz written by Richard Wess. Sidney Sheldon became dissatisfied with Wess's theme and musical score.  From the second season on, it was replaced by a new theme titled "Jeannie", composed by Hugo Montenegro with lyrics by Buddy Kaye. Episodes 20 and 25 used a rerecorded ending of "Jeannie" for the closing credits with new, longer drum breaks and a different closing riff. The lyrics were never used in the show.

Songwriters Gerry Goffin and Carole King wrote a theme, called "Jeannie", for Sidney Sheldon before the series started, but it was not used.

In the third and fourth seasons of the show, another instrumental theme by Hugo Montenegro was introduced that was played during the show's campy scenes. Simply titled "Mischief", the theme was heard mainly on outdoor locations, showing the characters attempting to do something such as Jeannie learning to drive, Major Nelson arriving up the driveway, a monkey walking around, or reactions to Doctor Bellows. This theme featured the accompaniment of a sideshow organ, a trombone, and electric bass. It was introduced in the first episode of season 3, "Fly Me to the Moon".

A popular cover version of the Jeannie theme was released in 1985 in the compilation Television's Greatest Hits: 65 TV Themes! From the 50's and 60's by TVT Records. This recording was later sampled in several songs, such as DJ Jazzy Jeff and the Fresh Prince's debut single "Girls Ain't Nothing but Trouble" (from their 1987 debut album Rock the House), and also for the Ben Liebrand 1990 re-release of American hip-hop artist Dimples D.'s single, "Sucker DJ".

DNA featuring Suzanne Vega released "Tom's Diner" in 1990 using a variation of the Jeannie theme song which then hit No. 5 on the U.S. Pop Chart and was rereleased the following year with other variations of "Tom's Diner", one of which was used by Nick-at-Nite for promos of its I Dream of Jeannie reruns.

The bottle 

Jeannie's iconic bottle was not created for the show. The actual bottle was a special Christmas 1964 Jim Beam liquor decanter containing "Beam's Choice" bourbon whiskey. It was designed by Roy Kramer for the Wheaton Bottle Company. For years, Sidney Sheldon was said to have received one as a gift and thought it would be a perfect design for the series. Several people in the Screen Gems art department also take credit for finding the bottle. Strong evidence, however, indicates first season director Gene Nelson saw one in a liquor store and bought it, bringing it to Sheldon.

Jeannie's bottle was left in its original dark, smoke-green color, with a painted gold-leaf pattern (to make it look like an antique), during the first season. The plot description of the pilot episode in TV Guide in September 1965 referred to it as a "green bottle". In that first episode, it also looked quite rough and weathered. Since the show was originally filmed in black and white, a lot of colors and patterns were not necessary. When the show switched to color, the show's art director came up with a brightly colored purple bottle to replace the original. The later colorized version of the show's first season tried to present that the smoked glass look of the original gold-leaf design was purple, to match the consistent look of the bottle used in the second through fifth seasons.

The first-season bottle had a clear glass stopper that Tony took from a 1956 Old Grand-Dad Bourbon bottle in his home, as the original stopper was left behind on the beach where Tony found Jeannie. In the first color episode, Jeannie returns to the beach, and her bottle is seen to have its original stopper (painted to match the bottle), presumably retrieved by her upon her return there. The rest of the TV series (and the films) used the original bottle stopper. (During some close-ups, one can still see the plastic rings that hold the cork part of the stopper in place.)

During the first season, in black and white, the smoke effect was usually a screen overlay of billowing smoke, sometimes combined with animation. Early color episodes used a purely animated smoke effect. Sometime later, a live smoke pack, lifted out of the bottle on a wire, was used.

Jeannie's color-episodes bottle was painted mainly in pinks and purples, while the bottle for the Blue Djinn was a first-season design with a heavy green wash, and Jeannie's sister's bottle was simply a plain, unpainted Jim Beam bottle.

No one knows exactly how many bottles were used during the show, but members of the production have estimated that around 12 bottles were painted and used during the run of the series. The stunt bottle used mostly for the smoke effect was broken frequently by the heat and chemicals used to produce Jeannie's smoke. In the pilot episode, several bottles were used for the opening scene on the beach; one was drilled through the bottom for smoke, and another was used to walk across the sand and slip into Tony's pack. Two bottles were used from promotional tours to kick off the first season, and one bottle was used for the first-season production.

Barbara Eden got to keep the color stunt bottle used on the last day of filming the final episode of the series. It was given to her by her make-up woman after the show was canceled while the show was on hiatus. According to the DVD release of the first season, Bill Daily owned an original bottle, and according to the Donny & Marie talk show, Larry Hagman also owned an original bottle.

In the penultimate episode, "Hurricane Jeannie", Nelson dreams that Dr. Bellows discovers Jeannie's secret, and that Jeannie's bottle is broken when dropped. A broken bottle is shown on camera. This was intended to be the series' final episode and is often shown that way in syndication.

Broadcast

Multi-part story arcs 
On several occasions, multipart story arcs were created to serve as backgrounds for national contests. During the second season, in a story that is the focus of a two-part episode and a peripheral plot of two further episodes (the "Guess Jeannie's Birthday" contest began with the opening two-part episode on November 14, 1966, concluding with the name of the winner revealed after the end of the fourth episode, "My Master, the Great Caruso", on December 5), it was established that Jeannie did not know her birthday, and her family members could not agree when it was, either. Tony and Roger use NASA's powerful new computer and horoscopic guidance based on Jeannie's traits to calculate it. The year is quickly established as 64 BC, but only Roger is privy to the exact date and he decides to make a game out of revealing it. This date became the basis of the contest. Jeannie finally forces it out of him at the end of the fourth episode: April 1.

In a third-season four-part episode ("Genie, Genie, Who's Got the Genie?" January 16 – February 6, 1968), Jeannie is locked in a safe bound for the moon. Any attempt to force the safe or use the wrong combination will destroy it with an explosive. Jeannie is in there so long that whoever opens the safe will become her master. The episodes spread out over four weeks, during which a contest was held to guess the safe's combination. This explains why Larry Hagman is never seen saying the combination out loud: His mouth is hidden behind the safe or the shot is on Jeannie when he says it. The combination was not decided until just before the episode aired, with Hagman's voice dubbed in. Over the closing credits, Barbara Eden announced and congratulated the contest winner, with 4–9–7 as the winning combination.

In the fourth season, a two-part episode, "The Case Of My Vanishing Master" (January 6–13, 1969), concerned Tony being taken to a secret location somewhere in the world, while a perfect double took his place at home. A contest was held to guess the location where Tony had been taken. Unlike earlier contests, the answer was not revealed within the story. At the end of "Invisible House For Sale" (February 3, 1969), a special "contest epilogue" had Jeannie and Tony reveal to the audience the "secret location", Puerto Rico, followed by the name of the "Grand Prize Winner".

Reception

Nielsen ratings 
While never a major ratings hit, the show did receive its highest Nielsen ranking during the fourth season (26th).

Syndication 
When reruns debuted on New York's WPIX, Jeannie won its time period with a 13 rating and a 23 share of the audience. The series averaged a 14 share and 32 share of the audience when WTTG in Washington, DC began airing the series. It was the first off-network series to best network competition in the ratings: "The big switch no doubt representing the first time in rating history that indies (local stations) have knocked over the network stations in a primetime slot was promoted by WPIX's premiere of the off-web Jeannie reruns back to back from 7 to 8 pm."

In India, Sony Entertainment Television showed the series dubbed in Hindi in the late 1990s.
It started airing again on Zee Cafe in India in 2020.

In Italy, the series aired on Rai 1 under the name Strega per amore (Witch for Love) aired from 1977 until 1980, then repeated on Paramount Channel from 2020 until 2021.

In France, TF1 aired the series dubbed in French from 1993 to 1998.

Home Media

DVD/Blu-ray 
Sony Pictures Home Entertainment has released all 5 seasons of I Dream of Jeannie on DVD in Regions 1, 2 & 4 in individual season releases and complete series box sets (there were two different packaging versions for the complete series of 20 discs). The first season was made available in both the original black & white and colorized editions — only the colorized version was included in the complete series releases from Sony.

On August 27, 2013, it was announced that Mill Creek Entertainment had acquired the R1 rights to various television series from the Sony Pictures library including I Dream of Jeannie. They subsequently re-released the first two seasons on DVD on April 1, 2014; Mill Creek released Season One in its original black-and-white format only as they currently do not have the rights to Sony’s colorized version. On October 6, 2015, Mill Creek Entertainment re-released I Dream of Jeannie: The Complete Series on DVD in Region 1, though it did not port over both of the special features found on the first season of the Sony releases. Mill Creek Entertainment released the entire series on Blu-ray, after several delays, on November 30, 2021. However, most consumers and reviewers complained that rather than true remastered HD, Mill Creek simply used an SD master upscaled to 1080i. The company has yet to admit this publicly to fans regardless of many inquires. Fortunately, the series streams in actual HD online, proving that such prints exist in the Sony vaults.

In Australia, a repackaged Complete Series collection was released on 23 November 2010 in a purple box (the first version was a pink box). On November 4, 2015, a 50th Anniversary Edition of The Complete Series was released. On 6 July 2016, all five individual seasons were re-released as well as another The Complete Series collection, now distributed through Shock Entertainment.

VHS 
Some episodes were released on VHS. This is a complete list.

Reunion films 
Barbara Eden starred in two made-for-television reunion films which followed the further exploits of Jeannie and Tony in the successive years. Larry Hagman did not reprise his role as Tony Nelson in either film. Bill Daily returned as Roger Healey for both films, while Hayden Rorke made a brief appearance in the first film. In 1985, Wayne Rogers played the role of retiring Colonel Anthony Nelson in I Dream of Jeannie... Fifteen Years Later. In 1991, I Still Dream of Jeannie was broadcast with Hagman's Dallas co-star Ken Kercheval essentially playing the role of Jeannie's "master". A third film was planned but never finalized.

Animated series 
Hanna-Barbera Productions produced an animated series Jeannie. This animated series is completely separate from the Eden live-action series. Jeannie, the animated series was originally broadcast from
September 1973 to 1975, which featured Jeannie (voiced by Julie McWhirter) and genie-in-training Babu (voiced by former Three Stooges star Joe Besser) as the servants of Corey Anders, a high-school student and surfer (voiced by Mark Hamill).

Notes

References

Further reading

External links 

 
 Anthony (Tony) Nelson, fictitious astronaut – Encyclopedia Astronautica
 Roger Healey, fictitious astronaut – Encyclopedia Astronautica

 
1965 American television series debuts
1970 American television series endings
1960s American sitcoms
1970s American sitcoms
American fantasy television series
Romantic fantasy television series
Black-and-white American television shows
English-language television shows
Fantasy comedy television series
Genies in television
NBC original programming
Television shows adapted into films
Television series about couples
Television series about NASA
Television series by Screen Gems
Television series by Sony Pictures Television
Television series created by Sidney Sheldon
Television shows set in Florida
Television series about astronauts
Television series about the United States Air Force